The Ciudad Deportiva del Real Valladolid, commonly known as Campos Anexos al Estadio José Zorrilla, is the training ground and academy base of the Spanish football club Real Valladolid. It was opened in 1988.

Located few metres west of the Estadio José Zorrilla, it is used for youth and senior teams trainings.

Facilities
 Central Stadium with a capacity of 1500 seats, is the home stadium of Real Valladolid Promesas, the reserve team of Real Valladolid.
 2 artificial pitches.
 Service centre with gymnasium.

Links
Estadios de España

References

Real Valladolid
Real Valladolid
Sports venues completed in 1988